Soligalichsky District is an administrative and municipal district (raion), one of the twenty-four in Kostroma Oblast, Russia. It is located in the northwest of the oblast. Its administrative center is the town of Soligalich. Population:  12,304 (2002 Census);  The population of Soligalich accounts for 69.7% of the district's total population.

References

Notes

Sources

Districts of Kostroma Oblast